Eugène Jean (born 1950) is a Haitian painter. Born in Trou du Nord, Jean typically paints humorous scenes of common people. He has been a member of the Centre d'Art since 1971 and has had several exhibitions in the United States. He first worked with fellow Haitian painter Philomé Obin.

References
 
 

1950 births
Haitian painters
Haitian male painters
Living people